A crisis is a traumatic or stressful change for a person, or an unstable and dangerous situation for a society.

Crisis may also refer to:

Arts, entertainment, and media

Comics 
Crisis (Fleetway), a British comic
Crisis on Infinite Earths, by DC Comics, often called in-universe as just "The Crisis"

Films
Crisis (1939 film), a documentary about the 1938 Sudeten Crisis
Crisis (1946 film), a film directed by Ingmar Bergman
Crisis (1950 film), a film directed by Richard Brooks
Crisis (1972 film), a film directed by Robert Bruning
Crisis: Behind a Presidential Commitment, a 1963 documentary directed by Robert Drew
Crisis (2021 film), a film directed by Nicholas Jarecki

Music

Groups and labels
Crisis (band), a defunct punk rock group

Albums
Crisis (Alexisonfire album), a 2006 album by Alexisonfire 
Crisis (Ornette Coleman album), a 1969 album by Ornette Coleman
Crisis? What Crisis?, a 1975 album by Supertramp

Songs
"Crisis", a 1961 song by Freddie Hubbard from Mosaic (Art Blakey album) and from Ready for Freddie
"Crisis", a 1978 song by Bob Marley & The Wailers from the album Kaya
"Crisis", a 1991 song by Fear Factory from Soul of a New Machine
"Crisis", a 2016 song by Anohni from Hopelessness (album)

Periodicals
 Crisis Magazine, a publication of Sophia Institute Press
 The Crisis (newspaper), a newspaper published during the first half of the American Civil War by Samuel Medary
 The Crisis, the official magazine of the NAACP

Television 
 "Crisis" (M*A*S*H), a 1974 episode of the CBS television series
 Crisis (TV series), 2014 television series produced for NBC
Crisis, the alternate title for Kraft Suspense Theatre in syndicated reruns
 "Crisis", episode 3 of the 1964 Doctor Who serial Planet of Giants; may also refer to the original recorded version that never aired

Literature
Crisis (Majfud novel), a 2012 novel by Jorge Majfud
Crisis (Cook novel), a 2006 novel in the Jack Stapleton and Laurie Montgomery series by Robin Cook

Economics 
Crisis theory, a theory generally associated with Marxian economics
Financial crisis, a variety of situations in which some financial institutions or assets suddenly lose a large part of their value

Psychology 
Existential crisis, when a person doubts if his or her existence has a purpose
Identity crisis (psychology)
Midlife crisis, several issues that confront some people aged from 40 to 55
Quarter-life crisis, a recently coined similar term for 20- to 30-year-olds
Suicidal crisis

Other uses
Crisis (charity) (formerly Crisis at Christmas), a British charity
 Crisis (dynamical systems), the sudden appearance or disappearance of a strange attractor as the parameters of a dynamical system are varied
 Chinese translation of crisis, popular misconception that "crisis" is translated "danger"+"opportunity"

See also 
 climax (disambiguation)
 Critical (disambiguation)
 Crysis, a video game
Khrysis, American music producer
 Emergency
 The Crisis (disambiguation)
Crises (disambiguation)